Rajisha Vijayan is an Indian actress, who primarily appears in Malayalam films, in addition to a few Tamil films and Telugu films.   She hosted several television shows in Malayalam before making her acting debut in the 2016 film Anuraga Karikkin Vellam, for which she won the Kerala State Film Award for Best Actress.

Early life and education
Rajisha Vijayan was born in Perambra, Kozhikode, Kerala, India to Vijayan and Sheela. She graduated in Mass Communication and Journalism from Amity University, Noida.

Career
She hosted Susi's Code, a youth-centric programme and a music chat show. She hosted Surya challenge along with Vidhu Pratap on Surya TV.
She  also anchored Ugram Ujwalam, a talent show aired on Mazhavil Manorama.

Rajisha Vijayan debuted in the Malayalam film Anuraga Karikkin Vellam. She won the Kerala State Film Award for Best Actress in 2016 for the role, and went on to receive a nomination for a Filmfare Award for Best Actress - Malayalam.

Her second role was in the commercially failed movie Georgettan's Pooram alongside Dileep. Her next venture was
Oru Cinemakkaran starring Vineeth Sreenivasan. She also acted in a theatre drama, Hand of god as a queen.

In 2019, Rajisha Vijayan appeared in the lead role in the coming of age film June by Friday Film House. Both the film and her performance were critically and commercially acclaimed.

Rajisha Vijayan played her Tamil debut in Karnan, directed by Mari Selvaraj and featuring Dhanush, Lal, Natarajan Subramaniam, Yogi Babu, Gouri Kishan and Lakshmi Priyaa Chandramouli.

In 2020, she appeared in the Khalid Rahman directorial movie Love, opposite Shine Tom Chacko.

Filmography

Film
 All films are in Malayalam, unless otherwise noted.

Television

Awards and nominations

References

External links 
 

Actresses in Malayalam cinema
Actresses in Tamil cinema
Actresses in Telugu cinema
Indian film actresses
Living people
Actresses from Kozhikode
Kerala State Film Award winners
Actresses in Malayalam television
Indian television actresses
21st-century Indian actresses
South Indian International Movie Awards winners
Amity University, Mumbai alumni
1991 births